This is a list of television programs currently and formerly broadcast by YTV in Canada.

Current programming
As of January 2023:

Original programming

Live-action series

Animated series

Acquired from Nickelodeon (U.S.)

Live-action series

Animated series ("Nicktoons")

Mini-series/specials

Acquired from Paramount+

Animated series

Acquired from Peacock

Animated series

Other acquired programming

Live-action series

Animated series

Anime

Repeats of ended programming

Animated series

Acquired from Nickelodeon (U.S.)

Live-action series

Upcoming programming

Original programming

Animated series

Acquired from Nickelodeon (U.S.)

Live-action series

Animated series

Acquired from Paramount+

Live-action series

Animated series

Former programming

Original programming

Live-action series

Comedy series

Drama series

Fantasy series

Reality series

Game shows

Mystery series

Science fiction series

Variety series

Animated series

Preschool series

Live-action series

Animated series

Short series

Acquired from Nickelodeon (U.S.)

Live-action series

Animated series ("Nicktoons")

Preschool series

Acquired from Peacock

Live-action series

Animated series

Other acquired programming

Live-action series

 2point4 Children (2002–04)
 8 Simple Rules (2010–11; 2020)
 Adventures in Rainbow Country (1988–90)
 The Adventures of Black Beauty (1988–89)
 The Adventures of Robin Hood (1988–89)
 Al Oeming – Man of the North (1988-1990)
 America's Funniest Home Videos (2010–21)
 Andy Robson (1988-1989)
 Are You Being Served? (1994–95, 1998–2005)
 Arthur C. Clarke's Mysterious World (1988-1989)
 Audubon Wildlife Theatre (1988–91)
 Back to Sherwood (1999–2000)
 Bad Boyes (1989–90, 1992–93)
 Barriers (1988–89)
 Batman (1992–96)
 Beakman's World (1995–96)
 Big Bad Beetleborgs (1997)
 Bizarre (1994–95)
 Blake's 7 (1989–92)
 Bonanza (1988–93)
 Bottom (1996–98)
 Boy Dominic (1988–89)
 Boy Meets World (1998–2001)
 Bread (1989–93; 1995)
 Buffy the Vampire Slayer (1997–2003)
 Carnival Eats (2022)
 Carol Burnett and Friends (1988–93)
 Chef! (1996–97)
 Circus (1988–93)
 The Cisco Kid (1992–96) 
 Contact (1988–90)
 Dead Last (2001–03)
 Deepwater Black (1997–99)
 Deke Wilson's Mini-Mysteries (1990–94)
 Dennis the Menace (1992–94)
 Doctor Who (1989–94)
 Do It for Yourself (1992-1993)
 Don't Ask Me (1988)
 Dr. Fad (1988–91)
 Dracula: The Series (1994–95; 1997)
 The Edison Twins (1988–94)
 Eerie, Indiana (1996–97)
 Elephant Boy (1988–91)
 EMU-TV (1989–92)
 Endurance (2003–08)
 Escape from Scorpion Island (2010)
 Everybody Hates Chris (2010)
 The Facts of Life (2011)
 Falcon Beach (2007–09)
 Fame (1990–94)
 Family Ties (1995–96)
 Farscape (1999–2001)
 Fear (2002–06)
 Five Times Dizzy (1988–89)
 The Flaxton Boys (1988–90)
 Flipper (1991–96)
 Flipper (1996–2000)
 Follyfoot (1988-1989)
 The Forest Rangers (1988–93)
 Free to Fly (1988–90)
 The Fresh Prince of Bel-Air (2005–08)
 Friday Night Lights (2011)
 Frontier Doctor (1988–89)
 Fudge (1995–96)
 Full House (2003–06)
 The Generation Gap (1990–92)
 Genius Junior (2018)
 George (1988-1990)
 Get Smart (1990–95)
 Ghost Trackers (2005–10)
 The Ghosts of Motley Hall (1988–90)
 Gilmore Girls (2006–08)
 Girlz TV (2003–07)
 Going Great (1988–90)
 Goldie's Oldies (July 2, 2021 – 2021) 
 Gruey (1990–93)
 Harrigan (1988–90)
 The Haunting Hour: The Series (2014–17)
 Hey Vern, It's Ernest! (1995)
 The Hilarious House of Frightenstein (1989–92)
 The Hitchhiker's Guide to the Galaxy (1989)
 Hollywood's 10 Best (2005)
 Home and Away (1988–94)
 Home Improvement (2008–11)
 I Love Mummy (2002–03)
 Incredible Story Studios (1998–2003)
 The Intrepids (1994–96)
 Jep! (1998–99)
 The Judge (1989–91)
 Junior Chef Showdown (2021–22)
 Just for Laughs: Gags (2012–17)
 Just Kidding (2014–2020)
 Just Like Mom (1988–91)
 The KangaZoo Club (1988–91)
 Karaoke Star Jr. (2009)
 Katts and Dog (1993–95)
 Keeping Up Appearances (1997–2003)
 Kevin Can Wait (2016–17)
 Kids Can Rock and Roll (1997–98)
 Kid's Corner (1988-1993)
 The Kids of Degrassi Street (1990–91; 1993–94)
 Kyle XY (2011–12)
 Lassie (1988–92)
 Lassie (1997–2000)
 Let's Go (1988–92)
 Life Unexpected (2010)
 Little House on the Prairie (1991–95)
 The Little Vampire (1991–93)
 The Littlest Hobo (1991–95)
 The Lone Ranger (1988–91; 1993)
 Lucy Sullivan Is Getting Married (2000–02)
 Madison (1995–98, 2006–07)
 Maid Marian and Her Merry Men (1990–93)
 Malcolm in the Middle (2006–10)
 Man with a Plan (2016–17)
 Max Glick (1994–96)
 Me & Max (1988–90)
 Me and My Girl (1990–91)
 Merlin (2017)
 Mr. Microchip (1988–89)
 The Middle (2016; 2020)
 The Muppet Show (1988–94)
 My Babysitter's a Vampire (2014–15)
 My Family (2001–07)
 My Favorite Martian (1988–91)
 My Wife and Kids
 NBA Inside Stuff (1994–95)
 Neon Rider (1995–98)
 The New Leave It to Beaver (1989–92)
 News from Zoos (1988–93)
 Ninja Turtles: The Next Mutation (1997–98)
 No Sweat (1997–98)
 Ocean Girl (1998–2002)
 The Odyssey (1998–99)
 One Foot in the Grave (1999)
 Operation Ouch! (2017)
 OWL/TV (1992–95)
 The Paul Daniels Magic Show (1990–94)
 Pollywog (1989–94)
 Positive Parenting (1990–93)
 Power Rangers (1993–94; 2011–14)
 Press Gang (1992–93)
 Profiles of Nature (1992–94)
 Raven's Home (2017)
 Ready or Not (2003–06)
 The Real World (1993–94)
 Red Dwarf (1990–94)
 The Red Green Show (1993–95)
 Robin of Sherwood (1988–90)
 Ronnie & The Browns (1990–93)
 Rough Guide (1993–99)
 The Roy Rogers Show (1988–92)
 Sabrina the Teenage Witch (2002–11)
 The Sausage Factory (2005–06)
 Saved by the Bell (2001–08)
 Saved by the Bell: The College Years (2001–08)
 Scariest Places on Earth (2001–03)
 Second Honeymoon (1988)
 Shazam! (1988)
 Small Talk (1995–98)
 Smallville (2005–10)
 Smith & Smith (1988–92)
 Snowy River: The McGregor Saga (1994–96)
 Space: 1999 (1990–92)
 Spatz (1990–94)
 Stars On Ice (1988)
 Starstreet (2002)
 Stingray (1992–95)
 Streetnoise (1990–94, 1996)
 Suburgatory (2016)
 Super Dave (1993–98)
 Superhuman Samurai Syber-Squad (1994–95)
 Surf Shack (1998–2000)
 Surf's Up! Let's Cook (1998–2000)
 S.W.A.L.K. (1988-1990)
 Swans Crossing (1992)
 Sweet Valley High (1994–98)
 Swiss Family Robinson (1994–95)
 Tarzán (1993–98)
 Tattooed Teenage Alien Fighters from Beverly Hills 
 That's Incredible! (1989–92)
 The Chronicles of Narnia
 The Third Man (1988–90)
 They Must Be Mad (1993–98)
 Thumb Wrestling Federation
 Thunderbirds (1992–95)
 Tilt 23 1/2 (1994–96)
 Today's Parent (1994)
 The Tomorrow People (1988–89)
 Topper (1989–90)
 The Tripods (1988–91)
 The Trouble with Tracy (1988–90)
 The Twilight Zone (1994–96)
 Vid Kids (1991–92)
 Weird Science (1995)
 What I Like About You (2010)
 Whatever Turns You On (1988-)
 Wheel 2000 (1998–99)
 The White Shadow (1990–91)
 Whose Line is it Anyway? (1995–96)
 Wide World of Kids (1991–92)
 Wild Guess (1988–92)
 The Wild Side (1991–92)
 Willy and Floyd (1988–91) 
 Wipeout (2012–14)
 Wipeout Canada (2014)
 Wishbone (1996–2000)
 Wonderstruck (1989–93)
 Wonder Why? (1994–95)
 World's Funniest Videos: Top 10 Countdown
 The Worst Witch (1998–2002)
 Worzel Gummidge (1988–91)
 Yes, Dear
 Yes Minister (1995–97, 1999–2001)
 Yes You Can (1988–91)
 You Can't Do That on Television (1988–94)
 Young Hercules (1998–99)
 The Young Ones (1996–97)
 Young Sherlock: The Mystery of the Manor House (1988, 1990)
 Zorro (1990–95)

Animated series

 44 Cats (2019–20)
 Action Man (2000–03)
 Adventures of Sonic the Hedgehog (1994–95)
 The Adventures of Rocky and Bullwinkle and Friends (1990–96, 1998–2002)
 The Adventures of Tintin (2000–01)
 Æon Flux (1996–97)
 Alienators: Evolution Continues (2001–02)
 All Dogs Go to Heaven: The Series (1996–99)
 Alvin and the Chipmunks (1994–97)
 The Amazing Adrenalini Brothers (2006–08)
 Animaniacs (1993) (1998–2003)
 Animaniacs (2020) (November 21, 2020)
 Artifacts (2000)
 Barbie Dreamhouse Adventures (2018-22)
 Batman Beyond (1999–2005)
 Biker Mice from Mars (1993–95)
 Blackstar (1988–90)
 Bob and Margaret (2005–07)
 Bobby's World (1998–2000)
 The Bots Master (1994–96)
 Brambly Hedge (1997–99)
 Brats of the Lost Nebula (1998–2001)
 Bratz (2005-06)
 Bucky O'Hare and the Toad Wars (1991–93)
 Bump in the Night (1995–98, 2003)
 Cadillacs and Dinosaurs (1993–94)
 Captain N and the Video Game Masters (1992–93)
 Captain Planet and the Planeteers (1992–95)
 Captain Power and the Soldiers of the Future (1995–97)
 Care Bears (2003–05)
 Casper the Friendly Ghost (1990–97)
 Casper's Scare School (2009–10)
 The Charlie Brown and Snoopy Show (1996–2004)
 Charlie Chalk (1991–95)
 Committed (2006)
 Code Lyoko (2004–05)
 COPS (1994–97)
 Count Duckula (1989–93)
 The Cramp Twins (2003–04)
 Cubix (2002–03)
 D'Myna Leagues (2001–05)
 Daria (1998–2002)
 Dark Water (1991)
 Dawdle the Donkey (1998–2002)
 Dennis the Menace (1997–99)
 Denver, the Last Dinosaur (1989–94)
 Detention (2000–04)
 Dexter's Laboratory (1996–2006)
 Dino-Riders (1989–90)
 Dino Babies (1994–97)
 Dog City (1994–95, 1998–2000)
 Downtown (2000–02)
 Dragon Flyz (1996–99)
 DuckTales (2017) (2017; 2021)
 Dumb Bunnies (1998–2003)
 Earthworm Jim (1995–97)
 Eek! The Cat (1996–97)
 Enchanted Lands: Tales from the Faraway Tree (1998–2001)
 Extreme Ghostbusters (1997–99)
 Ever After High (2013-16)
 Fantastic Four: World's Greatest Heroes (2006–08)
 Fat Albert and the Cosby Kids (1988–90)
 Flash Gordon (1996–99)
 The Flintstones (1994–2002)
 Flying Rhino Junior High (2003–06, 2010–12)
 Freakazoid! (1998)
 Futurama (2007–09)
 Garfield and Friends (1993–2001)
 The Garfield Show (2009–14)
 Generation O! (2000–02)
 Geronimo Stilton
 Ghostbusters (1988–93)
 Grizzly Tales for Gruesome Kids (2000–03)
 Growing Up Creepie (2008)
 Hanazuki: Full of Treasures (2017)
 He-Man and the Masters of the Universe (1988–92)
 He-Man and the Masters of the Universe (2002–04)
 Hero High (1988–89)
 Hi Hi Puffy AmiYumi (2005–07)
 Histeria! (1999–2000)
 Home Movies (2000–02)
 Hoota and Snoz
 The Huckleberry Hound Show (1999–2000)
 Insektors (1996–98)
 Inspector Gadget (2007–08)
 Jackie Chan Adventures (2000–05)
 Jem (1990–91)
 The Jetsons (1996, 1998–2003)
 Josie and the Pussycats (2001–03)
 Justice League (2002–04)
 Justice League Unlimited (2004–06)
 Krypto the Superdog (2005–06)
 Kung Fu Dino Posse (2010)
 The Land Before Time (2007–08)
 Legion of Super Heroes (2007–08)
 Lego City Adventures (2020–22)
 Lisa
 Littlest Pet Shop (2012) (2013–17)
 Looped (2020)
 Mad Jack the Pirate (1998–99)
 Mamemo (2000–01)
 Mary-Kate and Ashley in Action! (2001–03)
 The Mask: Animated Series (1996–98)
 Men in Black: The Series (2002, 2005)
 The Mighty Hercules (1995–96)
 Mighty Max (1994–96)
 Monster High (2010-15)
 The Mr. Men Show (2008–11)
 Mummies Alive! (1997–98, 2001)
 The Mummy: The Animated Series (2001–03)
 Muppet Babies (1992–94, 1996)
 My Little Pony (1989–90, 1992)
 My Little Pony Tales (1993–94)
 The New Adventures of He-Man (1991–92)
 The New Adventures of Zorro (1988)
 The New Archies (1992–95)
 The New Fred and Barney Show (1994–95)
 The New Woody Woodpecker Show (1999–2005)
 Night Hood (1996–98)
 Ninjago (2018–20)
 Ninjago: March of the Oni
 Oggy and the Cockroaches (1998–2001)
 Painting Pictures (2000)
 The Pink Panther (1993–98)
 Pippi Longstocking (1999–2001; 2006–2007)
 Pinky and the Brain (1998–2000; 2002–04; 2007–09)
 Pinky, Elmyra & the Brain (2000)
 Plonsters (1999–2000)
 Pound Puppies (1986) (1989–90)
 Pound Puppies (2010) (2010–13)
 Power Players (2019–20)
 The Powerpuff Girls (1999–2005)
 Princess Gwenevere and the Jewel Riders (1996–98)
 Rabbids Invasion (2013–15)
 Rantanplan
 The Real Adventures of Jonny Quest (1996–97)
 Regal Academy (December 31, 2016–18)
 Rex the Runt (1999–2000)
 Robotboy (2006–08)
 Romuald the Reindeer (1996–99)
 Roswell Conspiracies: Aliens, Myths and Legends (1999–2001)
 Samurai Jack (2002–05)
 SantApprentice (2008–11)
 Santo Bugito (1995–96)
 She-Ra: Princess of Power (1988–93)
 Shopkins (2017-19)
 Shuriken School (2006–09)
 The Simpsons (2006-09)
 Sitting Ducks (2001–03)
 Skunk Fu! (2008–09)
 Snailympics
 Space Strikers (1994–96)
 Spartakus and the Sun Beneath the Sea (1988–89)
 Spider-Man: The Animated Series (1994–99)
 Spider-Man: The New Animated Series (2003–05)
 Spliced (2014–16)
 Static Shock (2001–05)
 Street Sharks (1995–96)
 Stressed Eric (1998–2002)
 Stuart Little: The Animated Series (2003–04)
 Super Duper Sumos (2001–02)
 Super Friends (2002–05)
 The Super Mario Bros. Super Show! (1991–96)
 Superman (1995)
 Teen Titans (2003–07)
 Teenage Mutant Ninja Turtles (original series; 1988–94)
 Tenko and the Guardians of the Magic (1995–96)
 The Three Friends and Jerry (1999–2001)
 Tiny Toon Adventures (1998–2000)
 Toxic Crusaders (1991-92)
 Transformers: Animated (2007–09)
 Transformers: Cyberverse (September 28, 2018; 2021–22)
 Transformers: Generation 2 (1994)
 Trollz (September 4, 2005)
 The Twisted Tales of Felix the Cat (1996–99)
 The Undersea Adventures of Captain Nemo (1989–90)
 The Wacky World of Tex Avery (1997–98)
 Waldo Kitty (1988-1992)
 Walter Melon (1998–2001)
 Waynehead (1996-98)
 Wayside (2015–2017; 2019–2021)
 Winx Club (original series; 2004–07)
 The Wizard of Oz (1997)
 Wolverine and the X-Men (2008–09)
 The Woody Woodpecker Show (1994–2004)
 Works
 The World of Peter Rabbit and Friends (1998–99)
 X-Men: Evolution (2001–05)
 X-Men (1995–98)
 Xiaolin Showdown (2004–07)
 The Yogi Bear Show (1995–97)
 The Zeta Project (2001–02)

Anime

 .hack//Sign (2005–06)
 Adventures of the Little Mermaid (1991–94)
 The Adventures of the Little Prince (1988–90)
 Astro Boy (2004)
 B-Daman Crossfire (2013–14)
 Battle B-Daman (2005–08)
 Beyblade (2002–06)
 Beyblade: Metal Fury (2013–14)
 Beyblade: Metal Fusion (2010–12)
 Beyblade: Metal Masters (2011–13)
 Beyblade: Shogun Steel (2013–15)
 BeyWarriors: BeyRaiderz (2014–15)
 BeyWheelz (2012–13)
 Bleach (2006–10)
 Blue Dragon (2008–09)
 Bob in a Bottle (1992–94)
 Case Closed (2006)
 Death Note (2007–08)
 D.I.C.E. (2005–06)
 Digimon (1999–2004)
 Dinosaur King (2008–10)
 Dragon Ball (1996–98, 2003–05)
 Dragon Ball GT (2003–2005)
 Dragon Ball Z (1997–2005)
 Duel Masters (2004–05)
 Eureka Seven (2006–08)
 Friends of the Forest (1995–97)
 Fullmetal Alchemist (2005–08)
 G.I. Joe: Sigma 6 (2006–07)
 Ghost in the Shell: Stand Alone Complex (2005–07)
 Hamtaro (2002–06)
 Hello Kitty and Friends (1995–97)
 Idaten Jump (2007)
 Inuyasha (2003–07)
 Jungle Tales (1992–94)
 Keroppi and Friends (1995–97)
 Kinnikuman
 Knights of the Zodiac (2003–04)
 The Littl' Bits (1992–94)
 Lucky Star (2010-12)
 Maple Town (1988–89)
 Maya the Bee (1992–98)
 Medabots (2001–04)
 Mew Mew Power (2005–07)
 Mobile Suit Gundam SEED (2004–07)
 Mobile Suit Gundam SEED Destiny (2007–08)
 Mobile Suit Gundam Wing (2000–03)
 Monster Rancher (1999–2003)
 Monsuno (2012–13)
 Naruto (2005–09)
 One Piece (2005–06)
 Pandalian (2006)
 Pinocchio: The Series (1991–93)
 Pokémon (1998–2014)
 Pokémon Chronicles (2005–07)
 Power Stone (2002-04)
 Pretty Cure (2009-10)
 Saber Rider and the Star Sheriffs (1989–91)
 Sailor Moon (1995–98, 2000–03)
 Samurai Pizza Cats (1992–97)
 Shaman King (2005–06)
 Sonic X (2005)
 Speed Racer (1994–96)
 Superior Defender Gundam Force (2004–05)
 Transformers: Armada (2002–04)
 Transformers: Cybertron (2005–07)
 Transformers: Energon (2004–05)
 Transformers: Robots in Disguise
 The Vision of Escaflowne (2000–01)
 Witch Hunter Robin (2004–06)
 Yu-Gi-Oh! (2002–07)
 Yu-Gi-Oh! 5D's (2008–12)
 Yu-Gi-Oh! GX (2005–08)
 Yu-Gi-Oh! Zexal (2011–14)
 Zatch Bell! (2005–07)
 Zoids: Chaotic Century (2002–04)
 Zoids: Fuzors (2003–04)
 Zoids: New Century (2002–04)

Preschool series

 The Adventures of Snelgrove Snail (1990–94)
 The Adventures of Spot (1999–2001)
 Alphabet Soup (1988–91)
 Anatole (1999–2002)
 Angelina Ballerina (2001–02)
 Animal Stories (1999–2000)
 Archibald the Koala (1999–2001)
 Babar (2001–02)
 Ballooner Landing (1994–98)
 Bananas in Pyjamas (1995–99)
 Barney & Friends (1997–98)
 Beezoo's Attic (1998–2001)
 The Berenstain Bears (2009–11)
 Bertha (1993–95)
 Big Sister, Little Brother (1999–2000)
 Brownstone Kids (1991–95)
 Bump (2000)
 Camp Cariboo (1989–97)
 The Cat in the Hat Knows a Lot About That! (2012)
 The Country Mouse and the City Mouse Adventures (1999–2003)
 The Crayon Box (1998–2001)
 Elliott Moose (2000–02)
 The Forgotten Toys (1998–2001)
 The Friendly Giant (1991–95)
 George Shrinks (2003–12)
 Gigglesnort Hotel (1988–91)
 Hands Up Hands On (1994–96)
 Jellabies (2000–01)
 Kipper (1998–2000)
 Kitty Cats (1995–2001)
 Kleo the Misfit Unicorn (2001–02)
 Lamb Chop's Play-Along (1992–97)
 LazyTown (2004–08)
 Little Bear (2001–03, 2010–11)
 Madeline (1995–97)
 The Magic Key (2002)
 Marie-Soleil (1988–98)
 Mister Rogers' Neighborhood (1991–93)
 Once Upon a Hamster (1995–2001)
 Pablo the Little Red Fox (2000–01)
 Paul Hann and Friends (1988–91)
 Percy the Park Keeper (1998–2000)
 Picture Pages (1989–93)
 Pocket Dragon Adventures (1998–99)
 The Poddington Peas (1991–95)
 Poetree and Friends (1994–97)
 Postman Pat (1991–95, 1999–2000)
 Puttnam's Prairie Emporium (1990–95)
 Rescue Heroes (2011–14)
 Rolie Polie Olie (2009–12)
 Romper Room (1993–95)
 Sesame Street (2020)
 Seven Little Monsters (2002–05)
 Sharon, Lois & Bram's Elephant Show (1991–93)
 Sheeep (2000–02)
 Size Small (1991–95)
 Sky Dancers (1996–98)
 Spider! (2000)
 St. Bear's Dolls Hospital (2000–01)
 Take Off (1994–95)
 Take Part (1988–95, 1997–98)
 Tell-a-Tale Town (1996–98)
 Thomas the Tank Engine and Friends (1992–94)
 Tickle on the Tum  (1988–91)
 Time to Read (1988–92)
 Timothy Goes to School (2008–13)
 The Toothbrush Family (1998–2000)
 Turtle Island (2001)
 The Twins
 Under the Umbrella Tree (1994–98)
 Waterville Gang (1988–95)
 What-a-Mess (1995–99)
 The Wind in the Willows (1994–96; 2000)

See also
 Nelvana
 List of programs broadcast by Nickelodeon (Canada)
 List of programs broadcast by Teletoon
 List of programs broadcast by Treehouse TV

Notes

References

External links
 YTV.com current show list

Lists of television series by network
YTV (Canadian TV channel) original programming
Anime television
Anime and Cartoon television